The 1874 Portsmouth by-election was fought on 16 March 1874.  The byelection was fought due to the incumbent Conservative MP, James Dalrymple-Horn-Elphinstone, becoming Lord Commissioner of the Treasury.  It was retained by the incumbent.

References

1874 elections in the United Kingdom
1874 in England
19th century in Hampshire
March 1874 events
Elections in Portsmouth
By-elections to the Parliament of the United Kingdom in Hampshire constituencies
Ministerial by-elections to the Parliament of the United Kingdom
Unopposed ministerial by-elections to the Parliament of the United Kingdom in English constituencies